Thomas Seitz (born 8 October 1967 in Ettenheim) is a German lawyer and politician of the AfD; he is a member of the völkisch-nationalistic group called Der Flügel ("The Wing") of his party. Since 2017 he has been a member of Bundestag.

Seitz grew up in Lahr in the Black Forest. He studied Law at Albert-Ludwigs-Universität Freiburg and University of Lausanne. He completed his legal clerkship at the Offenburg District Court. From 2008 until his election to the Bundestag, Seitz worked in Freiburg im Breisgau as a public prosecutor in the field of traffic law.

In 2010 he was a member of the right-wing party "Die Freiheit" ("German Freedom Party") for 10 months and became member of the AfD in spring 2013.

References

Living people
1967 births
People from Ettenheim
Members of the Bundestag for Baden-Württemberg
Members of the Bundestag 2017–2021
Members of the Bundestag 2021–2025
Members of the Bundestag for the Alternative for Germany